Raghdan Shehadeh (born 1 January 1977) is a former Syrian footballer who played for Syria national football team.

External links
worldfootball.net
11v11.com

1977 births
Syrian footballers
Living people
Syria international footballers
Place of birth missing (living people)
Al-Jaish Damascus players
Association football midfielders
Syrian Premier League players